Gap junction alpha-8 protein is a protein that in humans is encoded by the GJA8 gene. It is also known as connexin 50.

Related gene problems
1q21.1 deletion syndrome
1q21.1 duplication syndrome
microphthalmia  and other vision pathologies

Interactions
GJA8 has been shown to interact with Tight junction protein 1.

References

Further reading

Connexins